Richard Bently Boone (February 24, 1930 – February 8, 1999) was an American jazz trombonist and scat singer.

Career
Born in Little Rock, Arkansas, Boone sang in a Baptist church choir as a boy, then began playing the trombone at the age of twelve. He served with the U.S. Army from 1948 to 1953 where he played trombone in a military band. Out of the Army, he returned to Little Rock to study music at Philander Smith College. In 1956 Boone moved to Los Angeles where he played in venues with  Dolo Coker, Sonny Criss, and Dexter Gordon. Boone worked in the backup band for Della Reese between 1962 and 1966 then became a member of the Count Basie band. A few years later he left Basie and moved to  Copenhagen, Denmark, performing with the Ernie Wilkins Big Band.

Discography

As leader
 I've Got a Right to Sing (Nocturne, 1968)
 Make Someone Happy with Bent Jaedig (Polydor, 1977)
 Brief Encounter (Metronome, 1978)
 Swingin' in Helsingborg with Al Grey (Four Leaf, 1991)
 A Tribute to Love (Stunt, 1998)

As sideman
With Count Basie
 Hollywood...Basie's Way (Command, 1966)
 Broadway Basie's...Way (Command, 1966)
 Basie's in the Bag (Brunswick, 1967)
 Half a Sixpence (Dot, 1967)
 The Board of Directors (Dot, 1967)
 The Board of Directors Annual Report (Dot, 1968) with The Mills Brothers
 Basie Straight Ahead (Dot, 1968)
 Standing Ovation (Dot, 1969)
 Basie's Beat (Verve, 1967)
 The Happiest Millionaire (Coliseum, 1967)
 Manufacturers of Soul with Jackie Wilson (Brunswick, 1968) 
 How About This with Kay Starr (Paramount, 1968)
 
With Dexter Gordon
 The Resurgence of Dexter Gordon (Jazzland, 1960)
 More Than You Know (SteepleChase, 1975)

With Thad Jones
 By Jones I Think We've Got It (Metronome, 1978)
 Eclipse (Metronome, 1980)
 A Good Time Was Had by All (Storyville, 1989)

With Ernie Wilkins
 Ernie Wilkins and the Almost Big Band (Storyville, 1981
 Live! At Slukefter Jazz Club in Tivoli Gardens Copenhagen (Matrix, 1982)
 Montreux (SteepleChase, 1984)
 On the Roll (SteepleChase, 1987)

References

 The Jazz collections at the University Library of Southern Denmark

1930 births
1999 deaths
American expatriates in Denmark
American jazz singers
Boone, Richard Bently
20th-century American singers
Count Basie Orchestra members
DR Big Band members